Karsavan (also Romanized as Karsavān) is a village in Bavaleh Rural District, in the Central District of Sonqor County, Kermanshah Province, Iran. At the 2006 census, its population was 130, in 30 families.

References 

Populated places in Sonqor County